Angelo M. "Chubby" Cifelli (born March 27, 1939) is an American, singer, composer, and guitarist who grew up in Newark, New Jersey and attended Barringer High School.  As a musician he performed and wrote songs for Frankie Valli and The Four Seasons.  He first learned guitar in 1956 from Tommy DeVito.  He joined the Tradewinds in 1959 and the group had a hit single with "Furry Murray". The group performed on Dick Clark's American Bandstand to promote the release of the single.

Songwriting 
In the early 1960s, Cifelli teamed up with Mike Petrillo of Belleville.  They were introduced to each other by Frankie Valli.  Petrillo is an accomplished tenor saxophonist and plays solo sax lead on "Opus 17 (Don't You Worry 'bout Me)" by Valli and the Four Seasons.

In 1967, Cifelli and Petrillo co-wrote "Tell It to the Rain", a hit for Frankie Valli and the Four Seasons which reached number 10 on the Billboard Hot 100. The duo also wrote several other songs for Frankie Valli and the Four Seasons including "Fox in the Bush" and "Expression of Love" and "Patch of Blue".  In 2003, Joe Pesci recorded "Fox In The Bush".

External links
 Official website

References

1939 births
Living people
Barringer High School alumni
Songwriters from New Jersey
Musicians from Newark, New Jersey